The future of Iran’s democracy movement was a February 2023 meeting to discuss ways of uniting the Iranian democracy movement into an organized Iranian opposition. Held on Friday 11 February 2023, it was hosted by Georgetown Institute for Women, Peace and Security in Washington.

A panel of eight people joined together in one venue outside Iran and expressed their views. Participants were: exiled Reza Pahlavi, Shirin Ebadi and Canada-based Hamed Esmaeilion, President of the Association of Families of Flight PS 752 downed by Iran’s Revolutionary Guard in 2020, as well as US-based author, journalist and women’s rights activist, Masih Alinejad, actresses and activists Nazanin Boniadi and Golshifteh Farahani, former captain of Iran national football team Ali Karimi and Secretary General of Komala Party of Iranian Kurdistan, Abdullah Mohtadi were speakers of the group.

Alliance for Democracy and Freedom in Iran 

The charter was published in early March 2023

“Subsequent actions will take place with the participation of activists inside Iran to focus on fair transitional justice, the formation of a council for the transition of power, and the means by which power is transferred to a secular, democratic government,” 

The members of the alliance have said anyone is welcome to join them who accepts the core values of the group.

The "Mahsa Charter" of Solidarity

References 

Political factions in Iran
Politics of Iran
Mahsa Amini protests
Protests in Iran